Dihydroxyacetone synthase may refer to:

 Formaldehyde transketolase, an enzyme
 Transaldolase, an enzyme